Too is Madita's second solo album. It was recorded in 2007 and released on Couch records on January 25, 2008 in Austria. In other European countries and the United States, the album was released on March 28. It was primarily produced by the Austrian producer duo dZihan & Kamien. According to the Austrian adult contemporary radio station Hitradio Ö3, it could reach the 48th place of the Austrian charts.

History 
After her big success with her first album Madita, the Austrian singer started to record a new album in 2007. In Austria the album received a good reception. The magazine fm5 called it a hype in the alpine republic and the daily newspaper ÖSTERREICH compares her success with Falco's success in the 1980s.

In February 2008 Madita released the first single "Because".

Track listing

References

Websites 
 Madita's official site

Madita albums
2008 albums